The 2010 GMAC Bowl, the eleventh edition of the college football bowl game, was played at Ladd–Peebles Stadium in Mobile, Alabama, on January 6, 2010, as one of the final games of the 2009 NCAA Division I FBS football season. The game was telecast on ESPN and matched the Central Michigan Chippewas, champions of the Mid-American Conference, against the Troy Trojans, champions of the Sun Belt Conference.  Central Michigan won in double overtime, 44-41, on a 37-yard field goal by Andrew Aguila, his fifth of the game.

The opponent for the MAC team was scheduled to be the ninth selection of a team from the Atlantic Coast Conference.  However, the ACC only produced seven bowl-eligible teams in 2009.  Therefore, the GMAC Bowl was able to select an at-large team that was bowl eligible and did not have a prior conference tie-in.  Many had felt that the invitation would go to Notre Dame, who finished the season at 6-6. After lengthy meetings the Notre Dame administration made the decision that they will not go to a bowl game following the 2009 season. Also, Notre Dame would only have been eligible to fill the slot after all available teams with 7 or more wins had been accommodated. Several sportswriters pointed to the comparatively low payout of the bowl and the potential humiliation if Central Michigan (then the likely opponent) defeated the Irish.

Troy ultimately filled the slot after Southern Miss claimed Conference USA's slot in the 2009 New Orleans Bowl. Although that game has a guaranteed berth for the Sun Belt champion, the organizers used their prerogative to invite the conference's second-place team, Middle Tennessee, not wishing to repeat its Troy–Southern Miss matchup from 2008. As a 9-win team, Troy had priority over any 6–6 teams not already tied to specific bowl games.

Game facts 
 This was the first-ever football game between the two teams.
 Neither team had appeared in the GMAC Bowl prior to this matchup.
 The game was the only non-BCS game to match two conference champions.
 MAC representatives are 6-3 in the game. CMU's victory broke a 14-game bowl losing streak for the conference.

Game summary

Scoring summary

References

External links
 ESPN summary

GMAC Bowl
LendingTree Bowl
Central Michigan Chippewas football bowl games
Troy Trojans football bowl games
GMAC Bowl